Self and Identity is a subfield of psychology. As the name implies, it deals with topics pertaining to both self and identity. Key areas of investigation include self-concept, self-esteem, and self-control.

What distinguishes self and identity as a discipline is its scientific character. Emphasis is placed on the empirical testing of systematic theories about relevant phenomena. Hence, its methodological approach differs from both philosophy and sociology.
 
Self and Identity incorporates elements from different areas of psychology. However, it owes particularly large debt to personality psychology and social psychology.

Individual level analysis of the self
There are levels of analysis that one can look at self and identity. One level of analysis is the self on the individual level, for example, self-states, self-motives, self-esteem, self-efficacy, etc. Self-states are self-process that include unbiased self-awareness. However, self-motives are more serious impulses to action, something that is innate and societal or cultural analysis of the self.
The other level of analysis is on the societal or cultural level, for example, the cultural conception of a person, cultural arrangements that make the person who they are and the cultural concept of self.

Self and identity are highly contingent upon culture. In industrialized Western cultures, the concept of self is based solely on independence.

Collective Self-Esteem 
The attitude towards social groups has an effect on the individuals self-esteem towards their own group along with other groups. The collective self-esteem that is gathered from each group depends on how they're being treated. If the individual has a low self-esteem, the outlook on other groups can be negative and bonds with other groups can be difficult to manifest in the future. The way minority groups treat each other has this kind of effect within the group while treating other groups negatively depending on the individuals experiences with that group. Despite these group differences, some individuals who have a positive perspective of other minority groups can increase the individuals collective self-esteem, which can progress to what is called cross-group friendships. Cross-group friendships can be described as a positive relationship between the intergroup also referred to as cross-race friendship. "We therefore assumed that high-quality cross-group friendships would provide a sense of collective self-esteem among minority group members. In turn, collective self-esteem is likely to fuel collective action tendencies". When there is a positivity, high quality relations, and respect amongst these inner groups, this can increase collective self-esteem and collectivity within the community. The psychological well-being will increase amongst the minority groups that share a cross-race friendship. There are different self-esteems that are used depending on the different relations shared with the individual. The relational self pertains to aspects of the self-concept that are rooted in interpersonal attachments and that consists of aspects shared with significant others (e.g., family, friends) and define one's roles in those relationships. The collective self refers to aspects of the self derived from membership from social groups (e.g., ethnic group). These relationships shared from one person to the next can be described as one's self and identity. Self-esteem that is described in this context can change depending on the individuals outlook of life. The friends and family can be a contributing factor to the high or low self-esteem seen from each person. Social identity can relate to collective self-esteem because both relate to how the individual contributes to the group they belong to. Being able to understand the role one takes within their group might it be an ethnic group, social class, or some other group that one belongs to, the individual does what is necessary to improve their own collective self-esteem. Having a connection to other groups can contribute to some change might it be positive or negative depending on the collective self-esteem that has been manifested by the individual.

References

Further reading

External links
 Homepage of the International Society for Self and Identity
 Homepage of Self and Identity, a flagship journal

Ego psychology
Identity (social science)